Ron Hornaday Sr. (January 13, 1931 – December 21, 2008) was an American racer from San Fernando, California. He was the father of NASCAR Camping World Truck Series champion Ron Hornaday Jr. and the grandfather of Ronnie Hornaday. Hornaday was inducted in the West Coast Stock Car Hall of Fame in its first class in 2002. He made 17 NASCAR Monster Energy Cup Series starts between 1955 and 1973; mainly on the West Coast.

Racing career
He began racing at Saugus Speedway and later Ascot Park, driving the No. 97 Galpin Motors Ford. His weekly occupation was working as the parts and service manager for Galpin Motors, and he received sponsorship from his employer throughout his career. Hornaday made his first NASCAR Grand National start in 1955 at the Arizona State Fairgrounds. He finished 14th in a 29 car field to earn $25. He started racing in the Pacific Coast Late Model series (now the NASCAR Camping World West Series) in 1956. He began winning races a few years later, and he finished second in the 1962 season championship behind Eddie Gray. 

He won the season points championship in 1963, and he repeated as champion in 1964. In his Pacific Coast Late Model career he had 13 victories.

Death
Hornaday died in California from cancer on December 21, 2008. His son Ron commented on his website, "Our father was the inspiration to all of us and was a true champion to the very end. We will miss him so very much but it is a comfort to know that he is now with his beloved wife and our mother, Helen, where he wanted to be."

References

External links
 

1931 births
2008 deaths
Deaths from cancer in California
NASCAR drivers
People from San Fernando, California
Racing drivers from California
Sportspeople from Los Angeles County, California
Place of death missing